Westhouses is a village within Derbyshire, situated close to the town of Alfreton.  It is in the Bolsover district of the county. It is in the civil parish of Blackwell.  Named after West House Farm, the settlement was founded in the 1870s.

Railway 

The Midland Railway (later the London, Midland and Scottish Railway) was the main employer and landowner. Many roads such as Allport Terrace, Bolden Terrace and Pettifer Terrace were named after Midland Railway directors, and the school was also built and maintained by the company.

Most of the houses were two up and two down, with an outside toilet in the back yard, although the engine drivers' houses were bigger.  They did not have mains electricity until the early 1957 and were owned by the Midland Railway, later by the British Railways Board until about 1969.  There should have been 100 houses by the school but only 75 were built, stopping at 2, Bolden Terrace, apparently making it a semi-detached house by accident.  However, there were only ever two, built for the two shed foremen.  

A history of Westhouses was written by Gordon Henry Warwick in about 1962 as follows:
"The Hamlet of Westhouses
Now of this small village.  I should like to enlighten the inhabitants a little of its history. To begin with the houses and the population.
In its early stages, less than 80 years ago, there were only three houses in the village, which were all farm houses.  Now it has grown considerably and there are now 215 houses.
To start with the farms, there are three: West House Farm, West Pasture Farm and Park Mill Farm. Park Mill Farm, which is in Park Mill Lane, but before I go any further, I must tell you, that it is not really in West houses as that is in Blackwell Parish, and the farm is in Shirland parish, abut none the less it is always looked on as being in West houses.
I have been told that the dividing line between the two Parishes, is in the middle of the road and the farm.  The reason it is called Park Mill Farm, is because there was an old water mill attached to it, but it has not been working for a good number of years.  The old mill was demolished in around 1860.  There is also a brook running along the side of the farm, which was renowned for its trout fishing, and people used to come from far afield, to fish there, but unfortunately, when Industrial Progress started around here some years ago, in the form of Coke Ovens, at Morton Colliery, it polluted the water with the Chemicals and killed all the fish, which caused great indignation amongst the fishing enthusiasts.
The age of the farm dates back to the 17th Century, but I cannot tell you the exact date, but the present house, dates back 1898, but some of the out houses in the farm yard, belong to the original farm house. It has been inhabited by the Booth Family, for many years, buts its present owner is Mr H. Holmes.
We now cone to another farm, West Pasture Farm.  The present owner Mr E. Moore, and it has been in the Moore family for a good many years. The present owner’s grandfather was a very old gentleman, who died at the ripe old age of 94, but he was not the original owner of the farm.  It was originally built for the farm workers, of Westhouse Farm and a man named Mr Wood, lived there, as he worked for the Downings.  The old house was built in 1768, but that has quite recently been demolished.
Mr E. Moore’s, grandfather was a very active and enterprising man, in his heyday he built the first cottages in the village, eight in all, in the year 1886. Then he built the grocer’s shop and house in 1894, when the hotel in 1900, he sold the Hotel to the Shipstone Brewery Company in 1913.
Referring to the name of the farm West Pasture Farm, there are very few people in the village who know the name of the farm.
There was also an old village pump at the top of what is known as Moore’s lane and also an old well in the old house yard, which had a windlass, for drawing water and that well was used to supply most of the village with their water, in fact it used to be carted every day up to Westhouse Farm, as the water supply was very poor in those days.
West House Farm; this is the last of the farms and is the oldest farm of the three. It dates back over three hundred years, and has been in the Downing family since it was built until quite recent years, when it changed hands. The owner then being Mr Swain, until he died, and then it changed hands, to Mr Fretwell, who is the present owner.
These was an old font found in the basement of the house, which was very old indeed, but I cannot tell you the age of it, But Mr and Mrs Swain gave it to the Parish Church, and it is now in the Church yard, amongst other relics, which have been found from time to time.
Apart from the 215 houses, there is a Chapel, which was built in 1897.A church which was built in 1898. The hotel built in 1900. The Working Men’s Institute was built in 1911, but not as an Institute originally, but as a draper’s shop, with a sweet shop attached to it, and was owned by a Mr Edwards.
It was not until 1912 the Club took over the premises. Then there is the Railway Institute, which was built by the old Midland Railway, in 1893. And it has recently been modernized, with a bar attached to it. There is also a Co-operative Stores, built in 1898, a barbers’ shop, a cash grocers and a cobblers shop and a Post Office, built in 1893.
There is also a four acre field, which is the recreation ground, and some very good allotments.
There used to be a bridge across the railway line from the Institute, to the other bank, which the main traffic used to go to Blackwell, the other road from the Station being very narrow, but when the Railway Company made the new sidings and they took the old bridge down and then made a new and wider road, from the Station to Blackwell. I have been told the old bridge was demolished in 1901.
The village is mainly a Railway village as the majority of the inhabitants are Railway people. In fact the Railway is the main source of livelihood.
As I mentioned in the early stages, there were only three houses in the village, but as time went on and the railway Station was built, which was in 1884, then the Loco Sheds were built in 1891. Now it became apparent, that the railway men wanted somewhere to live and also near their work, so the Railway Company, so the Railway Company, started building some cottages.
They built 70 in all, and the first to be built were the 30 at the bottom of the hill, which is called, Midland Terrace, in 1891. The next to be built were the top 15 in the same row, they then continued to build the next three terraces, which are Allport, Pettifer and Bolden Terraces.  The Midland Terrace was always looked upon as the Drivers’ row, Allport and Pettifer terraces, as the Guards row, and finally, Bolden Terrace, which was built for the two Sidings Foremen.
The next to be built by the Railway Company was the School in 1897. Before the School was built, the children had to go to Blackwell or Alfreton. Referring to the Loco Sheds, the first man to sign on, when it opened, was Mr J. Timms, who incidentally was one of the two oldest men, the other being Mr Moore of West Pasture Farm, which were both 94 years of age.
Now for a word about the Religious activities of the village.
Before the Church and Chapel were built the Religious Services were held in the Station Booking Hall, where, is you look inside the, you will see what looks like a back rest, by the booking hall window. Actually it was used a reading desk and a portable pulpit. When the railway Institute was built, they transferred the Services there, so you see the people were not deterred from their worship. But eventually there was a Chapel built in 1897 and just a year later in 1898, a church was built, so now everybody can attend according to the denomination.
There is just one final word I should like to say there are not many people who can remember where the first Sermons were held in West houses. I will tell you, there were held in a tent, on the ground which the Hotel now stands.
Now we come to the Educational side of the village. As I told you previously the School was built by the Midland Railway in 1897, but has been taken over the County Council. There have been only School Masters, the first was Mr Robinson and the second, Mr Dicks.  After Mr Dicks retired, a Schoolmistress took over control, her name being Mrs Bansall and she has two other teacher under her.
The school has greatly diminished in size as the pupils when they attain the age of eleven, they go to the modern secondary School at Tibshelf.  The Standard of the education is very good and has brought some very good results in the way of Scholarships. Only this year there have been three scholarships gained by three girls, and all three will proceed to Swanwick Grammar School, after the summer recess. Now that is I think a credit to both Scholars and Teachers, and I sincerely hope they will follow it up and maintain the prestige of the village.
Talking about Scholarships, there is one pupil who gained a scholarship from this school and I think he is worthy of mention, his name is Gordon Warwick.
After gaining his Scholarship he proceeded to Clay Cross Secondary School, where he gained a further success by gaining a Major State Scholarship together with his school Certificate which enabled him to enter a University, in which case he selected Bristol University.  He graduated from these with a First after three years but unfortunately World war Two broke out and he was called up. He then joined the Officer Training Corps and was stationed in Harrogate for a while until he finished his training, he when proceeded to Africa, and from then to Italy where he remained until the end of the War. During his stay in Italy he had the distinction of being presented with the M.B.E. (Military) for devotion to duty, at the risk of his life.  He also attained the Rank of Captain in the R.A.
After the hostilities finished and the War was over he came back England, then after a brief holiday be went to Birmingham University, as a lecturer in Geography. He gained his BSc degree at Bristol University and since gained the degree of Doctor of Philosophy, and also a string of letters attached to his name.
So on the whole I think he is a credit to Westhouses, where he was born"
 

The mainline railway through Westhouses is the Erewash Valley line from Nottingham to Chesterfield.

A station existed very early in the lines development but was soon closed. The second station became known as Westhouses & Blackwell.

Branchlines ran to New Hucknall colliery and New Hucknall Sidings on the Great Central Railway.

A through line ran to Tibshelf, Sutton Colliery, Silverhill, Butcherwood and Pleasley Colliery, finally connecting with the Robin Hood line at Mansfield Woodhouse.

Built by the Midland Railway the engine shed included arrival and departure roads, an ash road, six internal roads and the legs road, which once had a shear legged crane positioned over it.  This was used for the lifting of locomotives.  The shed was intended to be a maintenance centre for the LMS but water supply problems prevented its expansion. Railwaymen's children would often be given a turn driving the locos during the 1930s, and in the diesel era rail enthusiasts would also be allowed to drive locomotives up and down the yard.

Besides working on the railway in the various grades, many local residents found employment at Blackwell Colliery, but there was little other employment and many were out of work in the 1930s depression.  A chapel of ease (the tin tabernacle) was built near the School and Recreation ground, and stood until its removal to the Midland Railway - Butterley near Ripley.  The organ was played by a lady who reputedly only knew two hymns, one of which was "The day thou gavest" and the other was "To be a pilgrim."

After the 1926 General Strike many villagers boycotted the Trent Bus Company as it had continued running buses during the emergency, and instead they patronised the local village service, which had gone out in sympathy.

 In the 1950s and 60's Jinty's 4F's, 8F's and 9F's were most common.  In steam days Garratts could be seen pounding up the gradient in front of a long line of coal wagons.  When diesels were introduced, classes, 08, 25, 47 and 45 were seen. Into the 1970s British Rail Classes 08, 20, 47 and latterly 56 were the main stay. Classes 25, 45, and 58 also visited the shed.

 The shed closed to locomotives when traffic defects caused a Class 56 to derail and the shed was deemed to be no longer in a usable condition.  Operations were moved to Tibshelf sidings until the complete closure of Westhouses as a traincrew depot in January 1987.

The last locally employed railway positions were the travelling shunters based in the flat-topped cabin at the start of Tibshelf Sidings, these positions were however made redundant when Silverhill colliery closed. The village still had a railwayman - Mr.H Turner at Toton, a former Westhouses man from 1960-2002.
 The building was actually condemned by Walter Warwick, born in 2, Bolden Terrace and who started his career as an engineering apprentice in the Shed, Health and Safety Manager for London Midland Region of British Railways, and the younger brother of Dr.Gordon Warwick, the geomorphologist, born in The Willows, Park Lane.

See also 
 List of places in Derbyshire

External links 

 Westhouses' history
 Westhouses' primary school
 Picture The Past - historical images of Derbyshire

Villages in Derbyshire
Bolsover District